In Greek mythology and Roman mythology, Erebus ("deep darkness, shadow"), or Erebos, is the personification of darkness and one of the primordial deities. Hesiod's Theogony identifies him as one of the first five beings in existence, born of Chaos.

Etymology 
The perceived meaning of Erebus is "darkness"; the first recorded instance of it was "place of darkness between earth and Hades". The name  Ἔρεβος itself originates from Proto-Indo-European  "darkness" (cf. Sanskrit rájas, Gothic riqis, Old Norse røkkr).

Mythology
The Greek oral poet Hesiod's Theogony (8th century BCE) portrays Erebus as the offspring of Chaos, and as the brother of Nyx (Night), by whom he is the father of Aether (Brightness) and Hemera (Day).

According to the Fabulae of Hyginus, Erebus, Nox (Night), Aether (Brightness) and Dies (Day) are the offspring of Chaos and Caligine (Mist); and Erebus, by Nox, is the father of Fate, Old age, Death, Destruction, Strife, Sleep, Dreams, Thoughtfulness, Hedymeles, Porphyrion, Epaphus, Discord, Misery, Petulance, Nemesis, Cheerfulness, Friendship, Pity, Styx, the Parcae (Clotho, Lachesis, and Atropos), and the Hesperides (Aegle, Hesperia, and Erythea).

In Cicero's De Natura Deorum, the following are "fabled" to be the children of Erebus and Nox (Night): Aether, Dies (Day), Amor (Love), Dolus (Guile), Metus (Fear), Labor (Toil), Invidentia (Envy), Fatum (Fate), Senectus (Old Age), Mors (Death), Tenebrae (Darkness), Miseria (Misery), Querella (Lamentation), Gratia (Favour), Fraus (Fraud), Pertinacia (Obstinacy), the Parcae (the Fates), the Hesperides and the Somnia (Dreams).

A cosmogony attributed to Alcman ( 7th century BCE) apparently makes Erebus the fourth being to come into existence, after Thetis, Poros and Tekmor.

In Aristophanes' comedy The Birds, Chaos, Erebus, Nyx and Tartarus were the first beings, before the existence of earth, air or heaven. Nyx "laid a germless egg in the bosom of the infinite deeps of Erebus", from which came Eros. Aether is also called the son of Erebus.

Erebus functions as the unanthropomorphized personification of darkness in the Theogony, and features little in Greek mythological tradition and literature. Though he plays no active role as a deity in later works, "Erebus" is used as a name for a region of the Greek underworld where the dead pass immediately after dying, and is sometimes used interchangeably with Tartarus.

Namesake
Five ships of the Royal Navy have been named HMS Erebus after Erebus.

Mount Erebus, the second-highest volcano in Antarctica, was named after HMS Erebus used by Sir James Clark Ross on his Antarctic expedition in 1841, later used in the ill-fated Franklin Expedition.

Notes

References 

Aristophanes, Birds in The Complete Greek Drama, vol. 2. Eugene O'Neill, Jr. New York. Random House. 1938. Online version at the Perseus Digital Library.
Beekes, Robert S. P., Etymological Dictionary of Greek, 2 vols. Leiden: Brill, 2009.
 Caldwell, Richard, Hesiod's Theogony, Focus Publishing / R. Pullins Company (1987). .
 Campbell, David A., Greek Lyric, Volume II: Anacreon, Anacreontea, Choral Lyric from Olympus to Alcman, edited and translated by David A. Campbell, Loeb Classical Library No. 143, Cambridge, Massachusetts, Harvard University Press, 1988. Online version at Harvard University Press.
Cicero, Marcus Tullius, De Natura Deorum in Cicero: On the Nature of the Gods. Academics, translated by H. Rackham, Loeb Classical Library No. 268, Cambridge, Massachusetts, Harvard University Press, first published 1933, revised 1951. . Online version at Harvard University Press. Internet Archive.
Fowler, R. L. (2013), Early Greek Mythography: Volume 2: Commentary, Oxford University Press, 2013. .
Gantz, Timothy, Early Greek Myth: A Guide to Literary and Artistic Sources, Johns Hopkins University Press, 1996, Two volumes:  (Vol. 1),  (Vol. 2).
Hard, Robin, The Routledge Handbook of Greek Mythology: Based on H.J. Rose's "Handbook of Greek Mythology", Psychology Press, 2004, . Google Books.
Hesiod, Theogony from The Homeric Hymns and Homerica with an English Translation by Hugh G. Evelyn-White, Cambridge, MA. Harvard University Press; London, William Heinemann Ltd. 1914. Online version at the Perseus Digital Library. Greek text available from the same website.
Homer, The Iliad with an English Translation by A.T. Murray, Ph.D. in two volumes. Cambridge, Massachusetts, Harvard University Press; London, William Heinemann, Ltd. 1924. Online version at the Perseus Digital Library.
Homer, The Odyssey with an English Translation by A.T. Murray, Ph.D. in two volumes. Cambridge, Massachusetts, Harvard University Press; London, William Heinemann, Ltd. 1919. Online version at the Perseus Digital Library.
 Hyginus, Gaius Julius, Fabulae in Apollodorus' Library and Hyginus' Fabulae: Two Handbooks of Greek Mythology, Translated, with Introductions by R. Scott Smith and Stephen M. Trzaskoma, Hackett Publishing Company, 2007. .
 Morford, Mark P. O., Robert J. Lenardon, Classical Mythology, Eighth Edition, Oxford University Press, 2007. .
Ovid, Metamorphoses, Brookes More, Boston, Cornhill Publishing Co. 1922. Online version at the Perseus Digital Library.
Quintus Smyrnaeus, Quintus Smyrnaeus: The Fall of Troy, translated by A.S. Way, Cambridge, Massachusetts, Harvard University Press, 1913. Internet Archive.
Schmitz, Leonhard, "E'rebos", in Smith, William (ed.) Dictionary of Greek and Roman Biography and Mythology, London, John Murray, 1848.

Night gods
Underworld gods
Greek primordial deities
Greek death gods
Characters in Greek mythology
Locations in the Greek underworld
Darkness
Personifications